Bairagi may refer to:
 Bairagi people, a social group of the Indian subcontinent
 Bairagi (raga), an Indian Classical Raga
 Bairagi (caste),  a section of Hindus Brahmins

See also
 Bairagia. a village in Bhola District of Bangladesh
 Bairagi Dwibedy, a Member of the Parliament of India
 Bairagi Jena, a Member of the Parliament of India